Biodiversity park in Hyderabad has been established during the Convention on Biological Diversity held in 2012. It was inaugurated along with a commemorative pylon by the Prime Minister of India Manmohan Singh. It was opened for the public at Gachibowli since 19 January 2015. The park was set up within the Telangana State Industrial Infrastructure Corporation (TSIIC) layout at a total cost of more than Rs. 2 crores. The Biodiversity park is 1.6 km from Raidurg metro station.

The pylon 
The commemorative pylon is an artistic expression of great mystery of life on earth and its creation. The pylon is a 32-foot-high elliptical structure made of limestone depicting the evolution of species — starting from an atom, evolving to become molecules, proteins, various life forms and the intelligent human being. The base of the pylon is composed of concentric circles representing nature's five elements – Earth, Air, Water, Fire and Ether. The circular pathway of black granite is engraved with names of different species. The fire ring is depicted by red granite and yellow limestone. The lower "ether" ring displays a world map with blue ocean waters. At the top of the pylon stands a double helix representing DNA.

The park 

The biodiversity park covers an area of 13-acre land and is divided into four sectors totally containing more than 200 different species of plants. Each of them is represented by a UNO-member country and planted by a scientist participated in the summit conference. It is currently taken care by the Telangana Forest Department.

Types of plant species in the park

Gallery

See also 
 Nehru Zoological Park
 Hyderabad Botanical Garden
 Biodiversity Park, Visakhapatnam

References

External links 

 Video recording of the commemorative pylon at Youtube.

Parks in Hyderabad, India